Because of Him is a 1946 American romantic comedy film directed by Richard Wallace and starring Deanna Durbin, Charles Laughton and Franchot Tone.

Plot 
Kim Walker (Deanna Durbin) is an ambitious waitress who dreams of being on the stage. She tricks respected stage actor John Sheridan (Charles Laughton) into signing a letter of introduction. Thanks to the forged letter, Kim then wins the role of Sheridan's co-star in his next play, much to the disgust of the writer Paul Taylor (Franchot Tone).

Cast
 Deanna Durbin as Kim Walker
 Charles Laughton as John Sheridan
 Franchot Tone as Paul Taylor
 Helen Broderick as Nora
 Stanley Ridges as Charles Gilbert 
 Donald Meek as Martin 
 Regina Wallace as Head Nurse 
 Charles Halton as Mr. Dunlap 
 Douglas Wood as Samual Hapgood

Production 
In February 1945 Universal announced that Deanna Durbin and Charles Laughton, who had previously appeared together in It Started with Eve, would be reunited in Catherine the Last, "a contemporary comedy-drama with music". It would be filmed before Merry Merry Marriage recently announced for Dubin. In May Richard Wallace signed to direct.

Franchot Tone, who had appeared opposite Durbin twice before, was signed in August 1945, when the title was changed to Because of Him. Filming started August 15, 1945.

Durbin had married the producer Felix Jackson in June 1945  and at the time of filming, she was pregnant with her first child.

Reception
The New York Times called it "an utterly pointless fable".

Durbin and Jackson later said "We thought that picture came closest to the so-called old-style Durbin story. Yet the New York critics gave us very bad notices. We don't know why."

References

External links
 
 
 

1946 romantic comedy films
1946 films
American romantic comedy films
American black-and-white films
Films scored by Miklós Rózsa
Films directed by Richard Wallace
1940s American films